Erislandy Savón Cotilla (born July 21, 1990) is a Cuban heavyweight amateur boxer. He won the 91 kg/201 lbs title at the 2008 Youth World Amateur Boxing Championships, the 2009 Pan American Championships at Super Heavyweight and also the AIBA World Boxing Championships 2015 and 2017 in Heavyweight.

Career
Savón who hails from Guantánamo is a nephew of Félix Savón and also a big puncher.
He won the Youth World Championships 2008.
At the National Championships he lost the 91 kg/201 lbs semifinal 2008 to Osmay Acosta 3:6 and was disqualified in 2009.

Savon won his first senior title at the 2009 PanAmerican Championships against Juan Hiracheta

He was sent to the 2009 World Amateur Boxing Championships at Super Heavyweight instead of national champion Robert Alfonso, beat two unknowns but lost to the eventual runner-up Roman Kapitonenko in his third bout.

At the 2011 World Amateur Boxing Championships he ran into an even bigger puncher and was stopped by the future champion Magomedrasul Majidov, but qualified for the Olympics. He did not participate in the 2011 Pan American Games.  At the 2012 Summer Olympics, he lost his opening match to Anthony Joshua.

He won the bronze medal at the men's heavyweight event at the 2016 Summer Olympics.  He beat Lawrence Okolie and Yamil Peralta before losing to Vasily Levit.

References

External links
 
 
 

Living people
1990 births
Sportspeople from Guantánamo
Cuban male boxers
Heavyweight boxers
Olympic boxers of Cuba
Olympic bronze medalists for Cuba
Olympic medalists in boxing
Boxers at the 2012 Summer Olympics
Boxers at the 2016 Summer Olympics
Medalists at the 2016 Summer Olympics
Pan American Games gold medalists for Cuba
Pan American Games medalists in boxing
Boxers at the 2015 Pan American Games
Boxers at the 2019 Pan American Games
Central American and Caribbean Games gold medalists for Cuba
Competitors at the 2014 Central American and Caribbean Games
Competitors at the 2018 Central American and Caribbean Games
AIBA World Boxing Championships medalists
World boxing champions
Central American and Caribbean Games medalists in boxing
Medalists at the 2015 Pan American Games
Medalists at the 2019 Pan American Games
21st-century Cuban people